Ion Dumitrescu (18 July 1925 – 1999) was a Romanian sports shooter. He competed in the individual trap event at the 1960, 1964, 1968 and 1972 Olympics and placed 1st, 5th, 11th and 30th, respectively. At the world championships he won bronze medals in team skeet in 1958 and in individual trap in 1961.

Dumitrescu took up shooting in 1950. After retiring from competition has worked as a shooting instructor and served as a member of the Romanian Federation of Sport Shooting (Federatiei Romane de Tir Sportiv).

References

1925 births
1999 deaths
Romanian male sport shooters
Trap and double trap shooters
Shooters at the 1960 Summer Olympics
Shooters at the 1964 Summer Olympics
Shooters at the 1968 Summer Olympics
Shooters at the 1972 Summer Olympics
Olympic shooters of Romania
Olympic gold medalists for Romania
Sportspeople from Bucharest
Olympic medalists in shooting
Medalists at the 1960 Summer Olympics
20th-century Romanian people